Gummies, gummi candies, gummy candies, or jelly sweets are a broad category of gelatin-based chewable sweets. Gummy bears, Sour Patch Kids, and Jelly Babies are widely popular and are a well-known part of the sweets industry. Gummies are available in a wide variety of shapes, most commonly seen as colorful depictions of living things such as bears, babies, or worms. Various brands such as Bassett's, Haribo, Betty Crocker, Hersheys, Disney and Kellogg's manufacture various forms of gummy snacks, often targeted at young children. The name "gummi" originated in Germany, with the term "jelly sweets" more common in the British English language.

History 

Gummies have a long history as a popular confectionery. The first gelatin based shaped candy was the Unclaimed Babies, sold by Fryers of Lancashire in 1864.

In the 1920s, Hans Riegel of Germany started his own candy company and eventually popularized the fruit flavored gummy candy with gelatin as the main ingredient. By the start of World War Two, the company started by Riegel employed over 400 people and produced multiple tons of candy each day. The company was named Haribo, and it became a main producer of gummy bears.

Ingredients  
Gummy candies are made mostly of corn syrup, sucrose, gelatin, starch and water. In addition, minor amounts of coloring and flavoring agents are used. Food acids such as citric acid and malic acid are also added in order to give a tart flavor to gummies. It is often that other gelling agents are used in place of gelatin to make gummy candies suitable for vegans or vegetarians, such as starch and pectin.

Types of gummies

Babies

The Jelly Babies gum candy was the first commercially available shaped gum candy. It originated in the United Kingdom. They were first produced by Fryers of Lancashire in 1864 and sold as "Unclaimed Babies".  By 1918 they were (and still are) produced by Bassett's in Sheffield as Jelly Babies.

Bears

The gummy bear originated in Germany, where it is popular under the name  Gummibär (rubber bear) or  Gummibärchen (little rubber bear). Hans Riegel Sr., a  maker from Bonn, produced these sweets under the Haribo company, which he started in 1920.

Bottles

Cola bottles are sweets in the shape of classic Coca-Cola-style bottles with a cola flavor. They are produced by numerous companies.  "Fizzy Blue Bottles", made by Lutti (formerly part of the French division of the Leaf Company, now controlled by a private investment group), are sweets typically found in a pick and mix selection. These are very similar to cola bottle gummies in shape, but they are usually sour and coloured blue and pink. "Blue Bottles", a variation from another company, are identifiable by the small rims around the sides, and are chewier and thicker, with a sweeter taste.

Rings

Ring-shaped gummy is often covered in sugar or sour powder. The most common and popular flavor is the peach ring. Other flavors include green apple, melon, blue raspberry, strawberry, and aniseed — although these are typically coated in chocolate. A commonly known producer of gummy rings is Trolli, for which the gummy rings are an important asset.

Red frogs
In Australia, jelly confectionery in the shape of frogs has been very popular since the 1930s. They are colored red or green, although they are usually referred to as "red frogs". These have influenced the shape, structure, consistency and formula that makes gummy bears. Red frog gummies are not associated with the Red Frogs Association.

Roadkill gummies
In February 2005, following complaints by the New Jersey Society for the Prevention of Cruelty to Animals, Kraft decided to stop production of the controversial Trolli U.S. Road Kill Gummies. The society complained that the products, shaped as partly flattened squirrels, chickens and snakes, would give children an incorrect message on the proper treatment of animals.

Teeth gummies
In Australia, jelly confectionery in the shape of teeth has been very popular since the 1930s. They are colored pink and white, with pink representing the gums and teeth being white. They have a slight minty flavor, similar to mint toothpaste.

Worm gummies
There are many types of gummy worms, and Trolli produces glow worm gummies, with glowing color and sour sugar.

Shark gummies 

There are also many types of gummy sharks, but the blue and white ones are the most popular.

Vitamin gummies 
There are also several multi-vitamin gummy bears, usually marketed for children, such as Flintstones Chewable Vitamins. These form of vitamins give off nutrients and protein for those that do not swallow pills or need various supplements to stay healthy.

Health considerations 
Times Scientists have studied adding the tooth-protecting sugar substitute xylitol to gummies to fight tooth decay.

Choking risks are higher with gummy candies; research shows that "hard, round foods with high elasticity or lubricity properties, or both, pose a significant level of risk," especially to children under three years of age. This can be resolved with the Heimlich maneuver.

Storage 
Storage of gummy candies in conditions of high humidity will result in the moisture migration of water molecules from the surrounding environment into the candy. If gummy candies are exposed to an environment that is high in moisture content, it is likely that moisture will permeate the candy and increase its relative moisture content. An increase of the candies moisture content will increase the molecular mobility of particles in the candy, leading to a variety of unwanted outcomes such as:

 Sucrose crystallization and subsequent grainy texture.
 A sticky candy surface.
 Diffusion of flavors out of the candy.
 Possibility of microbial growth.

Moisture migration of gummy candies can be prevented by storing candies in conditions where the surrounding environment is equal to their own moisture content.

See also 
Fruit Gems
Gumdrop
Jelly baby
Quince cheese
Swedish Fish
Jelly bean

References

External links 
 Gummy candies being made in a factory (video)

British confectionery
German confectionery
 

pl:Żelki (słodycze)
pt:Balas de goma